The following entertainers performed for U.S. military personnel and their allies in the combat theatre during the Vietnam War (1959–1975)

 The Hondells October 1966 
 Bobby Rydell
 Roy Acuff (1970)
 Anna Maria Alberghetti
 Carroll Baker 
 Madeleine Hartog-Bel
 Johnny Bench
 Polly Bergen
 Joey Bishop
 Vida Blue
 Jimmy Boyd
 James Brown
 Les Brown
 Anita Bryant
 John W. Bubbles
 Raymond Burr
 Sebastian Cabot
 Vikki Carr
 Jerry Colonna
 Chuck Connors
 Louis Cottrell Jr.
 Phil Crosby
 Vic Damone
 Sammy Davis Jr.
 Jackie DeShannon
 Phyllis Diller
 Ron Ely
 Dale Evans 
 James Drury
 Lola Falana
 Eddie Fisher
 Glenn Ford
 Redd Foxx
 Connie Francis
 James Garner
 Frank Gifford
 The Golddiggers
 Johnny Grant
 Teresa Graves
 Rosey Grier
 Joey Heatherton
 Tippi Hedren
 Charlton Heston
 Don Ho
 Bob Hope
 The Ink Spots
 Fran Jeffries
 Jack Jones
 Danny Kaye
 Jayne Kennedy
 Dawn Lake
 Ann Landers
 Christy Lane
 Frances Langford
 Piper Laurie
 Vicki Lawrence
 Bobby Limb
 Gloria Loring
 Jayne Mansfield
 Ann-Margret
 Mary Margaret and the Martells (1969)
 Mary Martin
 Diane McBain
 Barbara McNair
 Robert Mitchum
 Archie Moore
 Terry Moore
 Rita Moreno
 Jim Nabors
 Patricia Neal
 Julie Newmar
 Wayne Newton
 Nicholas Brothers (Fayard and Harold Nicholas)
 Chris Noel
 Kathleen Nolan
 Pat O'Brien
 Janis Paige
 Fess Parker
 Dian Parkinson
 Melody Patterson
 Denise Perrier (African American Female Entertainers in Vietnam)
 Suzanne Pleshette
 Mala Powers
 Stefanie Powers
 Charley Pride
 Penelope Plummer
 Martha Raye
 Debbie Reynolds
 Roy Rogers
 Jill St. John
 Nancy Sinatra
 Roger Smith
 Hank Snow
 Rick Springfield
 Connie Stevens
 Kaye Stevens
 James Stewart
 Joe Torre
 Doreen Tracey
 Johnny Unitas
 Mamie Van Doren
 John Wayne
 Raquel Welch
 Lawrence Welk
 Jonathan Winters
 Laurel Robinson and Lois Peeler – The Sapphires (film)
The Rajahs
 The Australian Beaumarks
 The Delltones
 The Lonnie B. and Vicki G. Show (1968)
 The Ralph Kimbrough and Dee Steele Show (1969)
 Quintessence 1970 (Clive and Stanley Romney, Sheryl Albiston, Jack McDonald, Ruth Sorensen)

References

Entertainers
United States in the Vietnam War
Entertainers
Entertainers